Dmitri Borisovich Yepifanov (born 31 January 1978) is a Russian professional football coach and a former player. He is the goalkeepers' coach for Russia women's national football team.

Club career
He made his Russian Football National League debut for FC Anzhi Makhachkala on 19 September 1998 in a game against FC Kuban Krasnodar. He played 9 seasons in the FNL for 8 different clubs throughout his career.

References

External links
 
 

1978 births
Footballers from Moscow
Living people
Russian footballers
Association football goalkeepers
FC Spartak-2 Moscow players
FC Anzhi Makhachkala players
FC Rostov players
FC Arsenal Tula players
FC Metallurg Lipetsk players
FC Oryol players
FC SKA-Khabarovsk players
FC Orenburg players
FC Dynamo Saint Petersburg players
Russian expatriate footballers
Expatriate footballers in Kazakhstan
Kazakhstan Premier League players
Russian expatriate sportspeople in Kazakhstan
FC Olimp-Dolgoprudny players
FC Torpedo Vladimir players